John Albert Cross (August 19, 1887 – November 16, 1948) was a Canadian professional ice hockey player.

Career 
Cross played most notably with the Toronto Ontarios of the National Hockey Association in 1913–14. He also played with the Moncton Victorias in the Maritime Professional Hockey League.

References

1887 births
1948 deaths
People from Ingersoll, Ontario
Toronto Ontarios players
Canadian ice hockey goaltenders